Saint Gregory the Illuminator Church of New Julfa, (Armenian: ,), is an Armenian Apostolic church in New Julfa, Iran. It is located in Small Meidan neighbourhood of New Julfa.

History 

Saint Gregory the Illuminator Church was built in 1633 by Khoja Minas. There are many khachkars in the church, some of which date back to 1641, 1643 and 1646. The church has a summer or outdoor chapel built in 1714, by Khoja Minas grandson. There are some tombstones in the courtyard, two of which are related to the founder of the church and the killings by Afghans in 1722.

See also
Iranian Armenians
List of Armenian churches in Iran

References 

Architecture in Iran
Churches in Isfahan
Armenian Apostolic churches in Iran
Oriental Orthodox congregations established in the 17th century
Tourist attractions in Isfahan
17th-century churches in Iran
1630s establishments in Iran